Tamburo is a surname. Notable people with the surname include:

Dick Tamburo (born c. 1930), American football player
Mike Tamburo (born 1977), American musician
Sam Tamburo (1926–1998), American football player

See also
Tamburo (film), a 2017 Indian film